Murchison County is one of the 141 Cadastral divisions of New South Wales, Australia.

Murchison County is named in honour of Sir Roderick Impey Murchison (1792–1871) First Baronet and geologist.

Parishes 
A full list of parishes found within this county; their current LGA and mapping coordinates to the approximate centre of each location is as follows:

References

Counties of New South Wales